Clayton is a town in Kent and New Castle counties in the U.S. state of Delaware.  Located almost entirely in Kent County, it is part of the Dover, Delaware Metropolitan Statistical Area. The population was 2,918 at the 2010 census.

History
Byrd's AME Church, the Clayton Railroad Station, Enoch Jones House, and St. Joseph's Industrial School are listed on the National Register of Historic Places.

Geography
Clayton is located at  (39.2906671, –75.6343727).

It was named after John Middleton Clayton, a prominent 19th-century Delaware lawyer and politician.

Demographics

As of the census of 2000, there were 1,273 people, 499 households, and 346 families living in the town. The racial makeup of the town was 90.26% White, 8.09% African American, 0.31% Native American, 0.08% Asian, 0.08% Pacific Islander, 0.47% from other races, and 0.71% from two or more races. Hispanic or Latino of any race were 1.34% of the population.

There were 499 households, out of which 32.1% had children under the age of 18 living with them, 49.9% were married couples living together, 15.2% had a female householder with no husband present, and 30.5% were non-families. Of all households 25.7% were made up of individuals, and 11.4% had someone living alone who was 65 years of age or older.  The average household size was 2.55 and the average family size was 3.05.

In the town, the population was spread out, with 27.2% under the age of 18, 7.3% from 18 to 24, 31.2% from 25 to 44, 20.3% from 45 to 64, and 14.0% who were 65 years of age or older.  The median age was 36 years. For every 100 females, there were 89.2 males.  For every 100 females age 18 and over, there were 81.1 males.

The median income for a household in the town was $43,462, and the median income for a family was $48,000. Males had a median income of $34,792 versus $25,862 for females. The per capita income for the town was $18,268.  About 4.0% of families and 7.0% of the population were below the poverty line, including 5.6% of those under age 18 and 8.1% of those age 65 or over.

Infrastructure

Transportation

Delaware Route 6 is the main east–west road in Clayton, passing through town on Main Street and heading west to Blackiston and east to Smyrna. In Smyrna, DE 6 intersects U.S. Route 13, which connects to the Delaware Route 1 toll road at two interchanges on each side of town. Delaware Route 300 passes through the southern part of Clayton on Wheatleys Pond Road, heading southwest to Kenton and northeast to Smyrna, where it joins DE 6 and follows that route to the US 13 intersection. Delaware Route 15 passes through the western part of Clayton, following DE 6 from the west before heading north on Duck Creek Road toward Middletown. The Delmarva Subdivision line of the Delmarva Central Railroad passes through Clayton, with the Delmarva Central Railroad having an interchange point with the Norfolk Southern Railway in the town.

Utilities
The Public Works department provides various utility services to Clayton. The public works department provides electricity to about 1,200 customers in Clayton. The town is a member of the Delaware Municipal Electric Corporation, a wholesale electric utility which provides electricity to municipal electric departments across Delaware. The department provides water to 1,100 customers in the town, with four underwater
wells and two elevated storage tanks. The public works department serves 1,100 sewer customers in Clayton, operating eight pumping stations and contracting with Kent County for wastewater treatment. The department contracts with Waste Industries for trash collection in Clayton. Natural gas service in Clayton is provided by Chesapeake Utilities, cable service is provided by Xfinity, and telephone service is provided by Verizon.

References

External links

Towns in Delaware
Towns in Kent County, Delaware
Towns in New Castle County, Delaware